Sizwe Lawrence Ndlovu (born 24 September 1980) is a South African rower. He won a gold medal in the Men's lightweight coxless four event at the 2012 Summer Olympics. It was South Africa's first ever Olympic gold medal for rowing.  The rest of the team were James Thompson, John Smith and Matthew Brittain.

References

1980 births
Living people
Rowers from Johannesburg
Zulu people
South African male rowers
Olympic rowers of South Africa
Olympic gold medalists for South Africa
Olympic medalists in rowing
Rowers at the 2012 Summer Olympics
Medalists at the 2012 Summer Olympics
21st-century South African people